Britannia railway station served Britannia near Bacup, Lancashire, England, from 1881 until closure in 1917. The station was just to the west of the summit of the line, which was also the highest point on the entire Lancashire and Yorkshire Railway (LYR) system.

History
The station was built by Samuel Warburton, who was contracted for the work on 28 July 1880; it had an island platform. The line opened on 1 December 1881, and with it, Britannia station.

To the west of the station was a skew arch bridge built to carry the Lee Moor Colliery tramway over the railway line.

On 29 August 1891 a goods train of 24 wagons carrying stone from Britannia ran away on the falling gradient of 1 in 34 (3%) and collided with a passenger train at Facit station. Three passengers died and six were injured.

In 1940 a passenger train became stuck in snow for five days at Britannia.

The station closed on 2 April 1917 as an economy measure, although passenger services on the line continued until 16 June 1947. Goods traffic between Facit and Bacup ceased around the same time, but the line was not lifted until at least August 1963.

Notes

References

Further reading

External links
Site of Britannia Station on navigable 1947 O.S. map

Disused railway stations in the Borough of Rossendale
Former Lancashire and Yorkshire Railway stations
Railway stations in Great Britain opened in 1881
Railway stations in Great Britain closed in 1917
1881 establishments in England